Santa Maria Madalena, Madeira is a settlement in Porto Moniz parish, Madeira, close to the island's northernmost point, Ponta do Tristão.

Madeira Island